The Daldykan ( or Долдыкан Doldykan) is a river close to Norilsk in Taymyrsky Dolgano-Nenetsky District, Krasnoyarsk Krai in Russia, a right tributary of the Ambarnaya.

The Daldykan has been regularly polluted by nickel industry, namely from Nornickel; as a result the river's water has turned red.

May 2020 Diesel spill 

In May 2020, 17,500 tonnes of diesel fuel spilt into the river from a power plant. Russia's president, Vladimir Putin, declared a state of emergency.

References

Rivers of Krasnoyarsk Krai